Diego de Aliaga Sotomayor y Santa Cruz (September 9, 1784 – November 4, 1825) was a Peruvian politician and aristocrat who served as the first Vice President of Peru, from 1823 to 1824, under the presidency of José Bernardo de Tagle y Portocarrero, Marquis of Torre Tagle, appointed by the Peruvian Congress.

Early life

Aliaga was born on September 9, 1784, in Lima, Peru to Sebastian de Aliaga and Maria Santa Cruz. He began his career as a lieutenant of the regiment of the nobility, and was later promoted as a captain and guard of Halberdiers till 1817, which was largely an honorary position.

Politics

At the same time, de Aliaga involved himself in commerce and communicated with conspirators who wanted to overthrow the Spanish monarchy from Peru. Gradually his interest for independence began to wane. But when José de San Martín declared Peru an independent state, he became active in the newly independent Peru. He became vice-president of the republic in 1823.

When Royalist forces invaded Peru, he and the president left their jobs and handed dictatorial power to Simon Bolivar. But then he and the president reached a backroom deal with the royalists, who failed to re-capture Peru.

Death

Fearing reprisals of Simon Bolivar, he and the president took refuge in a castle and died in 1825 of scurvy, in Callao, Peru. After his death, he was exonerated of treason charges but his assets were taken away.

References

Bibliography
 Basadre, Jorge: Historia de la República del Perú. 1822 - 1933, vol. 1 (8th edition, corrected and expanded). Edited for the Diario "La República" of Lima and the Universidad "Ricardo Palma". Santiago de Chile, 1998
 Mendiburu, Manuel de: Diccionario histórico-biográfico del Perú. Parte primera que corresponde a la época de la dominación española, vol. I. Lima, 1875
 Tauro del Pino, Alberto: Enciclopedia Ilustrada del Perú, 3rd edition, vol 1: AAA-ANG. Lima, PEISA, 2001.

External links
  Castañeda Jiménez, Manuel. "MANUEL JOSÉ DE SALAZAR Y BAQUÍJANO". El Congreso aprobó tal designación el 18 de noviembre de 1823 y estableció que su mandato fuese de cuatro años. Nombró igualmente, el mismo día a Diego de Aliaga y Santa Cruz, hijo segundo del Conde de San Juan de Lurigancho, como vicepresidente de la República. (online version, accessed 14 December 2020)

Vice presidents of Peru
1784 births
1825 deaths